Below is a list of Portuguese language exonyms for places in non-Portuguese-speaking areas. Some of them are used exclusively in European Portuguese (marked E) while others appear just in Brazilian Portuguese (marked B).

Some of these terms are becoming disused, being often replaced with others closer to the original spelling. Adoptions of foreign terms and names in general are more acceptable and easy to enter popular use in the Brazilian variety, with spelling pronunciations or not.

Afghanistan

Albania

Armenia

Austria

Australia

Azerbaijan

Belgium

Belize

Bulgaria

Canada

China

Croatia

Cuba

Cyprus

Czech Republic

Democratic Republic of the Congo

Denmark

Dominican Republic

Egypt

Estonia

Ethiopia

Finland

France

Germany

Greece

Guatemala

Haiti

India

Indonesia

Iran

Iraq

Ireland

Israel and Palestine

Italy

Jamaica

Japan

Kenya

Latvia

Lebanon

Lithuania

Luxembourg

Malaysia

Mali

Mexico

Moldova

Morocco

Myanmar

Nepal

Netherlands

North Korea

North Macedonia

Pakistan

Panama

Paraguay

Poland

Romania

Russia

Saudi Arabia

Serbia

Singapore

Slovenia

South Africa

South Korea

Spain

Sudan

Sweden

Switzerland

Syria

Tanzania

Thailand

Turkey

Uganda

Ukraine

United Kingdom

United States

Uruguay

See also 
 List of European exonyms

Exonym
Portuguese
Exonym